Koshi Province covers an area of . It is located at easternmost part of Nepal bordering by Tibet Autonomous Region of China in north Bagmati Province in west, Province No. 2 in south-west, Bihar of India in south, North Bengal of India in south-east and Sikkim of India in north-east. Sikkim and part of North Bengal of India forms ethno-linguistic relation with Nepal. Geography of Koshi Province in eastern Nepal is very diverse, of highest peaks of Himalayas in northern extremes to terai region to south. It lies between 86 degree 1 minute and 88 degree 3 minutes east longitude and 28 degree 2 minutes and 26 degree 3 minutes north longitude. Biratnagar, the industrial capital of Nepal, is the temporary capital of this province.

Landforms
Koshi Province has three folds; northern higher mountains, mid-hills and southern terai. The low land surrounded with hills known as inner-terai.

Higher Himalayas region
Higher Himalayas are northern parts of the Koshi Province which ranges above . It consists of sub-alpine and alpine climates. It comprises 3 districts of Koshi Province: Taplejung, Sankhuwasabha and Solukhumbu.

Mid-hills region
Mid-hills region or lesser Himalayas (Pahad) is a middle region between higher Himalayas and terai of Koshi Province which lies north of terai and south of higher himalayas. It also known as Mahabharat range. This region comprises 8 districts of Koshi Province: Panchthar, Tehrathum, Dhankuta, Bhojpur, Khotang, Okhaldhunga, Ilam and Udayapur.

Terai region
The southern part of the province has fertile agricultural plain land which is called terai. The terai region of Koshi Province comprises 3 districts: Jhapa, Morang and Sunsari.

Inner-terai region
The plain land area between Shiwalik hills and Mahabharat hills known as inner terai. Udayapur District of Koshi Province has part of Inner terai.

References

 
Geography of Nepal